Jack Sound is a treacherous body of water about  wide between the island of Skomer and the Pembrokeshire mainland that contains numerous reefs and a tidal race of up to 6 knots.

It is used by boats to avoid a three-mile detour around the island, and has its share of sunken shipwrecks.

The most popular wreck for divers is the MV Lucy, which sank in good condition in February 1967 after being abandoned by its crew owing to its cargo of calcium carbide. The Netherlands-registered coaster, was en route from Uddevalla, Sweden to Barry.

The sound is part of the Skomer Marine Conservation Zone.

References

Tides